is a railway station located in Shimonoseki, Yamaguchi Prefecture, Japan, operated by West Japan Railway Company (JR West).

Lines
Hatabu Station is served by the Sanyō Main Line and is also the terminus of the Sanin Main Line.

Adjacent stations

Transportation

Bus
Bus company (A loop-line bus in the city.)
 Sanden Kohtsu Co.,Ltd.

See also
 List of railway stations in Japan

External links

  

Railway stations in Japan opened in 1901
Railway stations in Yamaguchi Prefecture
Sanin Main Line
Sanyō Main Line
Stations of West Japan Railway Company